Blue Nile may refer to:
 Blue Nile, a river in Ethiopia and Sudan
 Blue Nile (state), a state in Sudan that is part of the Blue Nile region
 The Blue Nile, a Scottish band
 Blue Nile (company), an online jewelry retailer
 Nile Blue, a histological staining dye